David Leoni (born September 8, 1982 in Liverpool, United Kingdom) is an Olympic Games biathlete for Team Canada, who lives in Jasper, Alberta. He is also a six-time Canadian Junior Champion, and three time North American Champion.

References

External links

1982 births
Living people
Biathletes at the 2006 Winter Olympics
Canadian male biathletes
Olympic biathletes of Canada
Sportspeople from Edmonton